The following radio stations broadcast on AM frequency 690 kHz: 690 AM is a Canadian and Mexican clear-channel frequency. CKGM Montreal and XEWW Tijuana share Class A status of 690 kHz.

In Argentina 
 LRA4 in Salta, Salta.
 LU19 in Cipolletti, Río Negro.

In Canada 
Stations in bold are clear-channel stations.

In Colombia 
 HJCZ: Bogota.

In Mexico 
Stations in bold are clear-channel stations.
 XEMA-AM in Buena Vista de Rivera (Fresnillo), Zacatecas
 XEN-AM in Mexico City
 XERG-AM in Guadalupe, Nuevo León
 XEWW-AM in Tijuana, Baja California - 77 kW daytime, 50 kW nighttime, transmitter located at

In the United States

In Uruguay 
 CX 8 Radio Sarandí in Montevideo

References

Lists of radio stations by frequency